Henry D. Tazelaar is a lung, heart and transplant pathologist.

He obtained his B.A. at Calvin College then attended Rush Medical College of Rush University for his Doctor of Medicine (M.D). He then completed a residency in Pathology at Stanford University Medical Center, where he also obtained fellowship training in Surgical Pathology.  While at Stanford he also did and NIH postdoctoral fellowship in heart and lung transplant pathology in the Laboratory of Dr. Margaret E. Billingham.  He certified in Anatomic Pathology by the American Board of Pathology in 1988.

Tazelaar worked for 17 years at the Department of Pathology at the Mayo Clinic in Rochester, Minnesota and is currently a consultant at Mayo Clinic in Arizona and professor of Pathology, Mayo Clinic College of Medicine as well as being Vice Chair of Quality and Education in the Department of Laboratory Medicine and Pathology. Currently, Dr. Tazelaar is Chairman of the Department of Laboratory Medicine and Pathology at Mayo Clinic Scottsdale.

His areas of expertise are pulmonary pathology and cardiovascular pathology. He is nationally renowned as an expert in both these fields and lectures on a regular basis around the world.  He is active in multiple pathology societies and has served in leadership positions in several (United States and Canadian Academy of Pathology, Pulmonary Pathology Society). He was President of the Pulmonary Pathology Society from 2004 to 2006.

Writings
He is one of the editors of a major textbook on the pathology of lung disease., which was reviewed in 2006 in the New England Journal of Medicine  and the American Journal of Surgical Pathology.

Tazelaar was part of the team that described pulmonary lymphangioleiomyomatosis (a disease that occurs almost exclusively in women) in a male patient. Another important contribution is his paper on acute eosinophilic pneumonia, in which he showed that the pathologic finding in these cases was diffuse alveolar damage with prominent eosinophils.

He is a co-author of the lung and heart transplantation working formulations that provide guidelines to pathologists who interpret lung and heart biopsies from transplant patients.

External links
Mayo Clinic Profile

References

Living people
American cardiovascular pathologists
Rush University alumni
Stanford University alumni
Calvin University alumni
Year of birth missing (living people)